The Eisbach is a left-hand, northern tributary of the River Queich in the county of Südliche Weinstraße in the German state of Rhineland-Palatinate.

Course 
The Eisbach runs through the Palatine Forest first appearing about 1½ kilometres from where it empties into the Queich. It is formed by the confluence of its right headstream, the Eußerbach, and is left headstream, the Dernbach. It runs in a southeasterly direction through the rural part of the borough of Annweiler am Trifels. A few metres after passing under the Queich Valley Railway, which runs from Landau to Pirmasens, the Eisbach discharges into the Rhine tributary of the Queich immediately southwest of the hamlet of Neumühle.

Rivers of Rhineland-Palatinate
Rivers and lakes of the Palatinate Forest
Rivers of Germany